Diphtherinae is a monotypic subfamily of moths in the family Nolidae erected by Michael Fibiger and J. Donald Lafontaine in 2005. Its only genus, Diphthera, was erected by Jacob Hübner in 1809. The genus was moved from Noctuidae in 2013 after the phylogenetic analysis of Reza Zahiri et al. (2013).

Species
 Diphthera festiva Fabricius, 1775 – hieroglyphic moth

References

Noctuoidea genera
Nolidae